William Reibert Mapother Jr. (born April 17, 1965) is an American actor, known for his role as Ethan Rom on the television series Lost and starring in the film In the Bedroom. He is also known for the film Another Earth.

Personal life

Mapother was born in Louisville, Kentucky, the son of Louisa (née Riehm) and William Reibert Mapother Sr (c.1938–2006). His father was an attorney, bankruptcy consultant, and judge in Louisville between 1967 and 1970. William Sr. died on June 22, 2006 as a result of lung cancer and pulmonary fibrosis. Mapother Jr. is a first cousin of actor Tom Cruise, whose full name is Thomas Cruise Mapother IV.

Career
Mapother has become widely known as a character actor, and sometimes plays scary or otherwise dark characters. He played a pivotal role in Todd Field's In the Bedroom, and is perhaps best known as Ethan Rom in the TV show Lost, which he played for 11 episodes during the life of the series.

Mapother has also had considerable roles in a series of independent films, such as The Lather Effect, Moola, Hurt, and  Another Earth. Mapother starred in The Burrowers as a Native American fighter who joins a posse to help find missing white settlers.

In September 2007, he was elected to a three-year term on the National Board of Directors for the Screen Actors Guild.

He has provided the motion capture work for Agent 47, the main character in the 2012 video game Hitman: Absolution and also provided the voice before series veteran David Bateson was recast. In 2014, he played the lead in the paranormal horror film The Atticus Institute.

Filmography

Television

Video games

See also
 List of people from the Louisville metropolitan area

References

External links
Official website

1965 births
Living people
American male film actors
American male television actors
Male actors from Louisville, Kentucky
University of Notre Dame alumni
20th-century American male actors
21st-century American male actors